Topeşti may refer to several villages in Romania:

 Topeşti, a village in Drăgești Commune, Bihor County
 Topeşti, a village in the town of Tismana, Gorj County
 Topeşti, a village in Bârsești Commune, Vrancea County